Friedrich Hassaurek (8 October 1831 Vienna, Austria - 3 October 1885 Paris) was a United States journalist and ambassador.

Biography
He attended the Piaristen gymnasium. In the German revolutions of 1848, he served in the student legion, and was twice wounded. After the failure of the Vienna Rebellion in 1848, he came to the United States, settled in Cincinnati, Ohio, and engaged in journalism, politics, and the practice of law.

Hassaurek was prominent among campaigners for Abraham Lincoln during the 1860 Presidential election. In Kentucky, to gain a hearing, he appealed to the hospitality of the people.  In Dayton, Ohio, he threatened to stay a month and try night after night until given a chance to speak. At another time, being abused and pelted with stones and missiles of all kinds, he laid down a revolver, and threatened to shoot any one that advanced upon him. Having thus intimidated the rough element, he was permitted to speak.

He served as minister from 1861 to 1865. In 1865, he became editor of the Cincinnati Volksblatt. He was a Liberal Republican for Horace Greeley in 1872, and in 1876 campaigned for Samuel J. Tilden.

He died in Paris while on a tour for his health. Leopold Markbreit was his half-brother.

Works
 Four Years among the Spanish-Americans (New York, 1868)
 The secret of the Andes. Cincinnati, Robert Clarke & Company 1879 (Digital Version)

Notes

References
  This source records his birthdate as 9 October 1832.

External links
 

1831 births
1885 deaths
Journalists from Vienna
19th-century American diplomats
Austrian Empire emigrants to the United States
Forty-Eighters
Ohio Liberal Republicans
Ohio Democrats
Ohio Republicans
19th-century American journalists
American male journalists
19th-century American male writers
Ambassadors of the United States to Ecuador
Burials at Spring Grove Cemetery